Bals–Wocher House is a historic home located in Indianapolis, Indiana.  It was built in 1869–1870, and is a three-story, Italianate style brick dwelling with heavy limestone trim.  It has a low hipped roof with deck and paired brackets on the overhanging eaves.  It features stone quoins and an off-center arcaded loggia.

It was listed on the National Register of Historic Places in 1979.  It is located in the St. Joseph Neighborhood Historic District.

References

Individually listed contributing properties to historic districts on the National Register in Indiana
Houses on the National Register of Historic Places in Indiana
Italianate architecture in Indiana
Houses completed in 1870
Houses in Indianapolis
National Register of Historic Places in Indianapolis